2 Corinthians 11 is the eleventh chapter of the Second Epistle to the Corinthians in the New Testament of the Christian Bible. It is authored by Paul the Apostle and Timothy (2 Corinthians 1:1) in Macedonia in 55–56 CE. According to theologian Heinrich August Wilhelm Meyer, chapters 10–13 "contain the third chief section of the Epistle, the apostle's polemic vindication of his apostolic dignity and efficiency, and then the conclusion".

Text
The original text was written in Koine Greek. This chapter is divided into 33 verses.

Textual witnesses
Some early manuscripts containing the text of this chapter are:
Papyrus 46 (~AD 200)
Codex Vaticanus (325–350)
Codex Sinaiticus (330–360)
Codex Alexandrinus (400–440)
Codex Freerianus (~450; extant verses 1–2,9–10,20–21,28–29)
Codex Claromontanus (~550)
Papyrus 124 (6th century; extant verses 1–4, 6–9)
Papyrus 34 (~650; extant verses 2,4,6–7)

False Apostles
In verse 13, Paul writes of "false apostles". In verse 5 he has compared himself with the "super-apostles"  or the "apostles-extraordinary" . Meyer asks "Whom does he mean by τῶν ὑπερλίαν ἀποστόλων?". He notes that "according to Chrysostom, Theodoret, Grotius, Bengel, and most of the older commentators, also Emmerling, Flatt, Schrader, Baur, Hilgenfeld, Holsten, Holtzmann [among nineteenth century commentators], [he means] the actual summos apostolos, namely Peter, James, and John" but Meyer argues that "Paul is not contending against these, but against the false apostles" and recommends the translation "the over-great apostles". Meyer lists biblical commentators Richard Simon, Alethius, Heumann, Semler, Michaelis, Schulz, Stolz, Rosenmüller, Fritzsche, Billroth, Rückert, Olshausen, de Wette, Ewald, Osiander, Neander, Hofmann, Weiss, Beyschlag and others as having followed Beza's suggestion, according to which the pseudo-apostles were understood to be Judaistic anti-Pauline teachers.

Verse 14 
King James Version
 And no marvel; for Satan himself is transformed into an angel of light.
New King James Version
 And no wonder! For Satan himself transforms himself into an angel of light.

Verse 19 

New King James Version
 For you put up with fools gladly, since you yourselves are wise!
King James Version
 For ye suffer fools gladly, seeing ye yourselves are wise.

Verse 24 
 From the Jews five times I received forty stripes minus one.
 "Forty stripes minus one" (KJV: "Forty stripes save one"): The number of stripes Paul received at each time agrees with the traditions and customs of the Jews, based on : "forty stripes he may give him, and not exceed". In fulfilling that law, runs the tradition "with forty save one" and this is the general sense of their interpreters, as a settled rule "that scourging according to the law is with forty stripes save one" as Maimonides observes. According to the manner of scourging, a scourge of three cords could be use, that every stroke went for three stripes, so that by thirteen strokes, thirty nine stripes were given, and if a fourteenth had been added, there would have been forty two stripes and so have exceeded what the law allows. Thus Paul received the most severe scourging permitted from the Jews (cf. ).

Verse 33

 but I was let down in a basket through a window in the wall, and escaped from his hands.
 Cross reference: Acts 9:25

See also
Aretas IV Philopatris
Chapel of Saint Paul
Damascus
Related Bible parts: Deuteronomy 25, Acts 9, 2 Corinthians 2, 2 Corinthians 10, Galatians 1

References

Sources

External links
 King James Bible - Wikisource
English Translation with Parallel Latin Vulgate
Online Bible at GospelHall.org (ESV, KJV, Darby, American Standard Version, Bible in Basic English)
Multiple bible versions at Bible Gateway (NKJV, NIV, NRSV etc.)

2 Corinthians 11